Anne Ehscheidt (16 July 1919 – 26 August 1947) was a German diver who competed in the 1936 Summer Olympics. In 1936 she finished eighth in the 10 metre platform event. Ehscheidt committed suicide by gas on 26 August 1947, at the age of 28.

References

1919 births
1947 suicides
German female divers
Olympic divers of Germany
Divers at the 1936 Summer Olympics
Sportspeople from Frankfurt
Suicides by gas
Suicides in Germany
1947 deaths
20th-century German women